Aylesworth may refer to:

Aylesworth (surname)
Aylesworth, Indiana, an unincorporated community in the United States
Ailsworth, Cambridgeshire, England